Frank Schmidt (born 3 January 1974) is a German former professional footballer who is now manager of 1. FC Heidenheim. During his career he played as a defender.

Club career
Schmidt was born in Heidenheim. He began his career with 1. FC Nürnberg, and was promoted to the first team in 1992, and made his debut for the club in the first round of the 1992–93 DFB-Pokal, as a substitute for Hans Dorfner in a 7–1 win over amateur side TSV Osterholz. This was to be his only first-team appearance for the club, though, and in January 1994 he moved to TSV Vestenbergsgreuth, of the third-tier Oberliga Bayern. In his first season with the club he helped them qualify for the new third level of German football, the Regionalliga Süd, and the following year he was part of the team that shocked German champions Bayern Munich by knocking them out in the first round of the 1994–95 DFB-Pokal with a 1–0 win.

In 1996, TSV Vestenbergsgreuth merged with SpVgg Fürth to form SpVgg Greuther Fürth, and Schmidt was retained by the new club, but found it hard to break into the team, and left in 1997, joining Wiener SC, a lower league team in Austria. After six months with WSC he joined their neighbours First Vienna, where he spent a year playing in the Second Division, before returning to Germany to sign for Alemannia Aachen.

Schmidt's first season was a successful one, with the club winning the Regionalliga West/Südwest and promotion of the 2. Bundesliga, although it was marred by the sad death of coach Werner Fuchs not long before the season's end. Schmidt was a first-team regular in Aachen's first half-season in the second tier, before an injury suffered in a match against Tennis Borussia Berlin put him out of football for almost the whole of 2000. He returned to action for the second half of the 2000–01, and was a first-team regular during 2001–02, as the club narrowly escaped relegation, but signings such as Alexander Klitzpera and Quido Lanzaat in summer 2002 caused him to lose his place, and he left Aachen club for SV Waldhof Mannheim in January 2003, having been restricted to substitute appearances during the first half of the season.

Schmidt made eight appearances for Waldhof, who were also in the 2. Bundesliga, but was unable to prevent them being relegated in last place, and was released at the end of the 2002–03 season. He then signed for his hometown club, Heidenheimer SB, of the fifth-tier Verbandsliga Württemberg, and won promotion to the Oberliga Baden-Württemberg in his first season, with a second-place finish. He played at this level for a further three seasons, achieving top-five finishes each time, before retiring at the end of the 2006–07 season.

International career
Schmidt was named in Germany's squad for the 1993 FIFA World Youth Championship in Australia. He made one appearance during the tournament, as a substitute for Carsten Jancker in a 2–2 draw with Ghana in Germany's second group game, but the team were eliminated in the first round.

Coaching career
In 2007, Heidenheimer SB's football section was separated from its parent club, and took on a new name 1. FC Heidenheim. Not long after the beginning of the season, coach Dieter Märkle was sacked, and Schmidt was brought in to replace him. He achieved a fourth-place finish in his first season, in charge, enough to qualify for the Regionalliga Süd, which was to become the fourth tier of German football, following the introduction of a new, national, 3. Liga, which Heidenheim would reach the following year, winning the Regionalliga Süd title. Schmidt would lead the club to five years at this level, finishing in the top half each time, before they won the division in 2013–14 and earned promotion to the 2. Bundesliga.

Managerial statistics

Honours

Player
Alemannia Aachen
 Regionalliga West/Südwest (III): 1999

Manager
1. FC Heidenheim
 Württemberg Cup: 2008, 2011, 2012, 2013, 2014
 Regionalliga Süd (IV): 2009
 3. Liga (III): 2014

Individual
 3. Liga Manager of the Year: 2013–14

References

External links

1974 births
Living people
Association football defenders
German footballers
German expatriate footballers
Germany youth international footballers
1. FC Nürnberg players
1. FC Nürnberg II players
SpVgg Greuther Fürth players
Wiener Sport-Club players
First Vienna FC players
Alemannia Aachen players
SV Waldhof Mannheim players
1. FC Heidenheim players
German football managers
2. Bundesliga players
Expatriate footballers in Austria
3. Liga managers
1. FC Heidenheim managers